Irfan Pardesi is a Pakistani serial entrepreneur and investor. He has founded a number of companies including ACM Gold, Zee Foundation and Uprise Waterfront and serves as the chairman of Next Cellular. In July 2018, he was named to the board of Uprise.Africa.

He is also the largest shareholder of Skywise, South African domestic low-cost airline.

Early life and education
Pardesi was born in a wealthy family, his father, Haji Zakaria Haji Abdul Rahim Ismail Giga Pardesi, was a businessman in Dhaka and Salma Oza. At an early age, his family moved to Pakistan. Things changed for his family when protests against the recently formed Martial Law broke out. He was a respectful figure to General Zia and General Ershad and played an instrumental role in Ensuring that Ershad Passes the government to Zia's Civilian Counterpart in Bangladesh. His father supported the ruling government and at the Islamic Council of Foreign Ministers Conference, Reforms Conference and Educational Conferences, he remained keynote speaker due to his influential position.

Pardesi completed his schooling from the Beaconhouse Public School and Lecole. He traveled and stayed for extended periods in Africa during school times and received business and political lessons from his father. Pardesi completed his Bachelor of Science (BSc) in Operational Research from the London School of Economics in 2004. And dropped out of Harvard Business School in 2016

Career
After graduation, Pardesi worked at a Japanese investment house in the United Kingdom that negotiated operational leases for aircraft. In 2005, Pardesi worked as a professor at University of London International Programmes and partnered with a teacher in Pakistan to open an HR consultancy which was sold in 2005. He co-founded Accentuate Capital Markets (ACM Gold), a financial brokerage house, in 2006 with his sister Hina Kassam. Pardesi became CEO of the company. He also served as CEO of ACM Gold Limited which was sold to a Japanese Investment House in 2015. In July 2015, he resigned as CEO and remained on the board as Chairman for a year. In 2015, he acquired Sky Airlines and joined as CEO. He served as the Founder and CEO of Uprise Ventures, that invested capital in multiple startups, corporations and substantial listed companies. In 2017, he was appointed as the Chairman of NextCellular fintech company based in South Africa and Next360 a Mobile Network Operator with presence in 5 countries. He also joined the board of Uprise.Africa and School of Leadership.
In Jan 2020, Pardesi founded Zee Foundation and starting Serving Full Time as President of Zee Foundation.

Memberships and appointments
President International Memon Finance Commission
Executive Chairman Next360 Group
Advisor Uprise.Africa
Supreme Council Member Kutiyana Memon Association
Member Young Presidents Organization since 2008
Advisor Childlife Foundation
Member Entrepreneurs Organization since 2011
Associate Member Karachi Press Club
Member Pakistan Arts Council
Advisor Kiran Foundation
Lord of Dunfermline Scotland
Management Committee Saylani Welfare

References

Pakistani chief executives
Alumni of the London School of Economics
South African people of Pakistani descent
Living people
Year of birth missing (living people)